Charles Lowell may refer to:
Charles Russell Lowell, Sr. (1782–1861), Unitarian minister from Boston
Charles Russell Lowell (1835–1864), Union cavalry general
Charlie Lowell (born 1973), pianist for rock group Jars of Clay